Chris Roy may refer to:

 Chris Roy (musician), musician with Doll Factory
 Chris Roy Jr. (born 1962), member of the Louisiana House of Representatives